The Singles is a 2007 compilation album by British punk rock band The Clash that presents the singles of the band's career, it does not include any of the B-sides incorporated into the release of the earlier collection and compiled onto a single disc.

Track listing
 "London Calling" (from London Calling)
 "Rock the Casbah" (from Combat Rock)
 "Should I Stay or Should I Go" (from Combat Rock)
 "I Fought the Law" (from The Cost of Living and The Clash (U.S.))
 "(White Man) In Hammersmith Palais" (from The Clash (U.S.))
 "The Magnificent Seven" (from Sandinista!)
 "Bankrobber" (from Black Market Clash)
 "The Call Up" (from Sandinista!)
 "Complete Control" (from The Clash (U.S.))
 "White Riot" (from The Clash (U.K.))
 "Remote Control" (from The Clash (U.K.))
 "Tommy Gun" (from Give 'Em Enough Rope)
 "Clash City Rockers" (from The Clash (U.S.))
 "English Civil War" (from Give 'Em Enough Rope)
 "Hitsville U.K." (from Sandinista!)
 "Know Your Rights" (from Combat Rock)
 "This Is England" (from Cut the Crap)
 "This Is Radio Clash" (from This is Radio Clash)
 "Train in Vain" (from London Calling)
 "Groovy Times" (from The Cost of Living) (bonus track on some versions)

Charts

References

2007 compilation albums
Albums produced by Bill Price (record producer)
The Clash compilation albums